Agostina Paola Burani (born 4 October 1991) is an Argentinian basketball player. As of 2020 she plays for Union Florida and Argentina women's national basketball team.

She defended Argentina at the 2018 FIBA Women's Basketball World Cup.

References

External links

 Agostina Burani at the 2019 Pan American Games

1991 births
Living people
Argentine expatriate basketball people in Spain
Argentine expatriate sportspeople in France
Argentine expatriate sportspeople in Italy
Argentine women's basketball players
Argentine expatriate basketball people in France
Argentine expatriate basketball people in Italy
Basketball players at the 2019 Pan American Games
Centers (basketball)
Sportspeople from Lanús
Pan American Games competitors for Argentina